Chandrashekhar Azad Park (also known by its former name Alfred Park, and Company Bagh during the Company Raj) is a public park in Prayagraj, Uttar Pradesh, India. Built in 1870 to mark Prince Alfred's visit to the city, with an area of 133 acres, it is the biggest park in Prayagraj. It was renamed by the Uttar Pradesh Government after revolutionary Chandra Shekhar Azad, who sacrificed his life here during the Indian independence movement in 1931.

History
In 1870, old cantonments were transformed into a park when, after the Rebellion of 1857, new areas were developed.

Location
The park is in the Georgetown neighborhood and is surrounded by Tagoretown, Civil Lines and the University of Allahabad.

Landmarks
Being a big park it has some of very important heritage and recreational sites.
Chandra Shekhar Azad Memorial, where Azad sacrificed his life
Victoria Memorial. Large canopy made of Italian limestone, dedicated to Queen Victoria. It was opened on 24 March 1906 by James Digges La Touche. The canopy once sheltered a huge statue of Queen Victoria which was later removed.
Prayag Sangeet Samiti, a music training institute
Madan Mohan Malviya Stadium
Allahabad Museum
Allahabad Public Library

Being the biggest park, it attracts a large number of people. according to an estimate, approximately 5000 people visit this park in duration of 4:00 a.m. to 8:00 p.m.

See also
 List of tourist attractions in Prayagraj

References

Tourist attractions in Allahabad
Gardens in Uttar Pradesh
Memorials to Chandra Shekhar Azad